Charles Howard Norris (11 June 1934 – 30 January 2015) was a  international rugby union player.

He was capped twice by Wales as a prop, both times against , once in 1963 and once in 1966.

He was selected for the 1966 British Lions tour to Australia and New Zealand, and played in the first three tests against the All Blacks, giving him the distinction of earning more caps for the Lions than he did for his country.

Norris played club rugby for Tylorstown and Cardiff, making a record 415 appearances for Cardiff. He was born in Porth and died in Cardiff on 30 January 2015.

References 

1934 births
2015 deaths
Alumni of the University of Exeter
Barbarian F.C. players
British & Irish Lions rugby union players from Wales
Cardiff RFC players
Rugby union players from Porth
Rugby union props
Wales international rugby union players
Welsh rugby union players